The term Paleocene ammonites describes families or genera of Ammonoidea that may have survived the Cretaceous–Paleogene extinction event, which occurred 66.043 million years ago.  Although almost all evidence indicated that ammonites did not survive past the K–Pg boundary, there is some scattered evidence that some ammonites lived for a short period of time during the Paleocene epoch, although none survived the Danian (66-61 Ma); they were likely extinct within 500,000 years of the K-Pg extinction event, which correlates to roughly 65.5 Ma. The evidence for Paleocene ammonoids is rare and remains controversial.

Implications
There have been reliable reports of ammonite fossils from the early Paleocene. The most notable fossil finds of Paleocene ammonoids are Baculites vertebralis and Hoploscaphites constrictus in Denmark, the survivors joined by Eubaculites carinatus in the Netherlands.

Discoscaphites and Eubaculites (potentially along with other ammonite genera, such as Pachydiscus and Sphenodiscus) have reportedly been found in the Paleocene Hornerstown and Tinton Formations in New Jersey (dating to 66-65 Ma). However, there are questions whether some remains are not reworked from Maastrichtian layers. A single scaphitiid mould (tentatively referred to Hoploscaphites) was dated to the lower Danian, in the Sumbar River section of the western Kopet Dagh in Turkmenistan. Scattered remains of Eubaculites which were found near the Brazos River, Texas, were dubiously dated to the Danian.

List of purported Paleogene ammonite fossils
Cerithium Limestone, Denmark: Baculites vertebralis, Hoploscaphites constrictus
Maastricht Formation (Meerssen Member unit IVf-7), Netherlands: Baculites vertebralis, Eubaculites carinatus, Hoploscaphites constrictus
Tinton Formation and Hornerstown Formation, New Jersey: Discoscaphites, Eubaculites and possibly also Pachydiscus and Sphenodiscus
?Sumbar River, Turkmenistan? :"Hoploscaphites constrictus johnjagti"
?Brazos River K-T Boundary, Texas?: Eubaculites fragments

References 

Ammonites
Paleocene molluscs